Isaac Rodrigues de Lima (born 24 April 2004), known as Isaac, is a Brazilian footballer who plays as a forward for Fluminense.

Club career
Born in Teresina, Isaac initially played football for a school in his local neighbourhood, before switching to futsal at the age of nine. At the age of fifteen, he joined River Atlético Clube in Piauí, where his brother, Jean Carlos, was playing. The following year, he was considering quitting the sport, before being offered a trial at top flight club Fluminense. Initially reluctant, his brother convinced him to attend, and he joined the club in February 2021, following a successful trial.

He made his debut for Fluminense on 18 January 2023 in a 1–0 Campeonato Carioca win over Nova Iguaçu, coming on as a substitute for Lima.

Career statistics

Club

References

2004 births
Living people
People from Teresina
Sportspeople from Piauí
Brazilian footballers
Association football forwards
River Atlético Clube players
Fluminense FC players